The Jeddah TV Tower (برج تلفيزون جدة) in Jeddah, Saudi Arabia is a  television tower with an observation deck. The tower was completed in 2006.

See also

List of towers in Saudi Arabia

References 

2006 establishments in Saudi Arabia
Towers completed in 2006
Observation towers
Skyscrapers in Jeddah
Communication towers in Saudi Arabia